Ute Meta Bauer (born 1958). She is an international curator, professor of contemporary art and the director of the Centre for Contemporary Art (CCA) in Singapore.

Early life and education

Bauer was born in 1958 in Stuttgart, Germany. She studied at the Hochschule der Bildenden Künste, Hamburg, Germany, between 1980-1989. Her diplomas focus on art theory, visual communication and stage design. She has worked as a free-lance curator since 1985.

Career

From 1990 to 1994, Bauer was Artistic Director of the Künstlerhaus Stuttgart, where she programmed several exhibitions and conferences on contemporary art, such as Radical Chic (1993) and A New Spirit in Curating (1992). From 1996-2006, Bauer held an appointment at the Academy of Fine Arts Vienna in Austria, as a professor of theory and practice of contemporary art.

Bauer served as the Founding Director of the Office for Contemporary Art in Norway from 2002 to 2005. Afterwards, she moved onto Massachusetts Institute of Technology (MIT), where she acted as Associate Professor for Visual Arts until 2012. She was also the founding director of its Art, Culture, and Technology (ACT) programme.

From 2012 to 2013, Bauer was Dean of Fine Art at the Royal College of Art in London.

Ute Meta Bauer is the founding director of the Centre for Contemporary Art (CCA) in Singapore and has served as Professor of Art at Nanyang Technological University (NTU)'s School of Art, Media and Design since 2013.

Bauer served as a curator for the 17th Istanbul Biennial in 2022.

Exhibitions
Bauer has curated many exhibitions on contemporary art with a focus on transdisciplinary media. In 2012 she curated The Future Archive at the Neuer Berliner Kunstverein (n.b.k.), in Berlin, Germany. This show focused on artistic research projects of the 1970s and 1980s related to the Center for Advanced Visual Studies (CAVS), which was founded in 1967 by György Kepes at MIT. In 2005, Bauer curated the Mobile_Transborder Archive for InSite05, in Tijuana /San Diego, which consisted of a mobile unit created to connect various institutions, entities and individuals around issues related to the San Diego-Tijuana and the California-Baja California border region. In 2004, Bauer was the Artistic Director of the 3rd Berlin Biennale for Contemporary Art, which presented 50 contemporary artists at KW Institute for Contemporary Art and at the Martin-Gropius-Bau. The Biennale focused on 5 topics Migration, Urban Conditions, Sonic Scapes, Sashions and Scenes, and Other Cinemas Exhibited artists included: Fernando Bryce, Banu Cennetoğlu, Florian Hecker, Melik Ohanian, Ulrike Ottinger, Mathias Poledna, Aura Rosenberg, Bojan Sarčević, Dierk Schmidt, Nomeda & Gediminas Urbonas, and Amelie von Wulffen. She was the curator of the Nordic Pavilion (Norway, Sweden) for the 50th edition of the Venice Biennale in 2003. Curator of the exhibition First Story – Women Building/New Narratives for the 21st Century at the Palace Gallery, in 2001, for Porto European Cultural Capital and Architectures of Discourse for the Fundació Antoni Tapiès in Barcelona, Spain, in the same year.

Her recent co-curatorial projects include the exhibition Paradise Lost with Anca Rujoiu which inaugurated the Centre for Contemporary Art (CCA) in 2014. World Biennial Forum No. 1, Gwangju, South Korea with Hou Hanru in 2012 and the Documenta 11 (2001-2002), Kassel, Germany, along with Okwui Enwezor team. Bauer also co-curated the show Now Here at the Louisiana Museum of Modern Art in 1996, Humlebæk, Denmark, along with Laura Cottingham, Anneli Fuchs & Lars Grambye, Iwona Blazwick, among others.

Publications
 1992-94 META 1-4 (Stuttgart)
 2001 Education, Information, Entertainment. New Approaches in Higher Artistic Education (Vienna: Selene; Institut für Gegenwartskunst)
 2001-02 case (Barcelona, 2001; Porto, 2002)
 2003-06 Verksted # 1-6 (Oslo)
 2007 A Dynamic Equilibrium: In pursuit of public terrain (co-authored with Magali Arriola, Judith Barry, Teddy Cruz among others, México City)
 2009 What’s left…What remains? (Simposio Internacional de Teoría de Arte Contemporáneo, Patronage for Contemporary Art in Mexico City)
 2011 Stephen Willats: Art Society Feedback (with Anja Casser)
 2012 Intellectual Birdhouse, Artistic Practice as Research (co-edited with Florian Dombois, Michael Schwab and Claudia Mareis, Walther König, Köln)
 2013 World Biennale Forum No 1 – Shifting Gravity (co-edited with Hou Hanru, Hatje Cantz)
 2013 Magne Furuholmen: In Transit (co-authored with Selene Wendt, Forlaget Press)
 2014 AR – Artistic Research (co-edited with Thomas D. Trummer, Walther König, Köln)
2018 Place.Labour.Capital. (edited with Anca Rujoiu, NTU Centre for Contemporary Art Singapore)

References

1958 births
German art curators
Living people
German women curators